The Parish of Marulan is a parish of Argyle County located with the Goulburn Mulwaree local government area, which includes the towns of Marulan and Marulan South. The parish is bounded by Barbers Creek to the east, a small part of the Shoalhaven River to the south-east, and Jerrara Creek to the south. The Hume Highway and the Southern Highlands railway line run through the parish. Jerrara Road and Marulan South Road are other main roads in the area.

References

NSW Department of Primary Industries, Parish maps with added geological information
Plan of 61 farms measured for sale in the Parishes of Marulan and Uringalla near the village of Marulan, County of Argyle, New South Wales 1857, National Library of Australia
New South Wales Parish maps preservation project
Argyle County, Marulan
The Villages of Mulwaree Shire, the village of old Marulan

Parishes of Argyle County